The 1991–92 Northern Premier League season was the 24th in the history of the Northern Premier League, a football competition in England. Teams were divided into two divisions; the Premier Division, won by Stalybridge Celtic, and the First Division, won by Colwyn Bay. It was known as the HFS Loans League for sponsorship reasons.

Premier Division 

The Premier Division featured three new teams:

 Whitley Bay promoted as champions from Division One
 Emley promoted as runners-up from Division One
 Accrington Stanley promoted as 4th-place finishers from Division One
The Shepshed Charterhouse Renamed to Shepshed Albion in the next season.

League table

Results

Division One 

Division One featured three new teams:

 Colwyn Bay  promoted as runners-up of the NWCFL Division One
 Guiseley promoted as champions of the NCEFL Premier Division
 Knowsley United promoted as champions of the NWCFL Division One

League table

Promotion and relegation 

In the twenty-fourth season of the Northern Premier League Stalybridge Celtic (as champions) were automatically promoted to the Football Conference. Shepshed Albion were relegated to the First Division and Bangor City moved to the newly formed League of Wales; these three clubs were replaced by relegated Conference side Barrow, First Division winners Colwyn Bay and second placed Winsford United. In the First Division Newtown and Rhyl left the League to join the League of Wales and Irlam Town left the League altogether; these three sides were replaced by newly admitted Ashton United, Gretna and Great Harwood Town.

Cup Results
Challenge Cup:

Marine 1–0 Frickley Athletic

President's Cup:

Morecambe bt. Stalybridge Celtic

Northern Premier League Shield: Between Champions of NPL Premier Division and Winners of the Presidents Cup.

Stalybridge Celtic bt. Morecambe

References

External links 
 Northern Premier League Tables at RSSSF

Northern Premier League seasons
6